Mount Arbaba (Arbeba, Erbeba, ئاربه‌با) is a mountain of the Zagros Mountains range, near the city of Baneh in Kurdistan Province of western Iran.

It is in the Iranian Kurdistan region.

Landforms of Kurdistan Province
Iranian Kurdistan
Arbaba
Zagros Mountains